The Temco TT Pinto is a tandem two-seat primary jet trainer built for the United States Navy by Temco Aircraft of Dallas, Texas.

Design and development

The Temco Model 51 had been initially proposed to the US Air Force in response to an Air Force competition for a jet-powered primary trainer, which was won by the Cessna T-37 Tweet. The concept behind the Model 51 was an attempt to provide primary training in a jet-powered aircraft. The official name for the Model 51 was the Pinto.

The Pinto was a mid-wing, tricycle landing gear trainer with an enclosed cockpit powered by a single Continental Motors J69-T-9 (license-built Turbomeca Marboré) jet engine. The aircraft carried no armament.

The TT-1s were equipped with many of the same features found in operational jets, including ejection seats, liquid oxygen equipment, speed brakes, along with typical flight controls and instrument panels. Although the flight characteristics were considered good, the "wave off" capability was rated marginal due to being slightly underpowered.

After its first flight in 1956, the prototype was sent to the Naval Air Test Center (NATC) Patuxent River to be evaluated alongside the Beech Model 73 Jet Mentor. Fourteen of the aircraft, designated TT-1, were produced between 1955 and 1957.

AJI T-610 Super Pinto
In 1968, American Jet Industries (AJI) (later to become Gulfstream Aerospace) re-engined a TT-1 Pinto.  The J69 was replaced with a  General Electric CJ610 (the civil version of the J85).  The modified aircraft, called the T-610 Super Pinto, flew on 28 June 1968. The new engine significantly increased performance, with maximum speed reaching , and AJI marketed the aircraft as a light attack aircraft.

The prototype Super Pinto, together with drawings and production rights, were purchased by the Philippine Air Force, which planned to build the aircraft as the T-610 Cali.

Operational history

In 1959, these aircraft served in the Air Training Command at Pensacola, Florida and used in a training program demonstration testing the feasibility of using a jet-powered trainer for primary flight training.

By the end of 1960, the TT-1s were phased out of operations in the Naval Air Training Command because performance was deemed insufficient, and sold as surplus.

Variants
TT-1 Pinto
Two-seat primary jet trainer aircraft.
American Jet Industries T-610 Super Pinto
Re-engined with  General Electric CJ610-6 turbojet.

Operators

 United States Navy

Surviving aircraft

In December 2016, five of the TT-1 Pinto series still appeared on the U.S. civil roster (one with an expired certificate), down from seven, four of them Super Pintos, in 2011.

As of late 2015, one T-610 prototype was still preserved at the Philippine Air Force Museum.

Specifications (TT-1)

See also

References

Bibliography
 Dillon, Mike. "Will lovely loser become super winner?" Air Progress, Vol. 24, no. 3, March 1969.
 
 Frankel, Mark. Temco TT-1 Pinto (Naval Fighters Nº72). Simi Valley, California: Ginter Books, 2007. .
 
 Taylor, John W. R. Jane's All The World's Aircraft 1971–72. London: Sampson Low, Marston & Co. Ltd, 1971. .
 Taylor, Michael J.H. Jane's Encyclopedia of Aviation (Vol. 5). Danbury, Connecticut: Grolier Educational Corporation, 1980. .

External links

 Temco Model 51
 Temco TT-1 "Pinto"
 Minijets – Temco 51 TT-1 Pinto

TT Pinto
TT, Temco
Single-engined jet aircraft
Mid-wing aircraft
Aircraft first flown in 1956